Harpactira is a genus of African tarantulas that was first described by Anton Ausserer in 1871.

Species
 it contains fifteen species, found in Namibia and South Africa:
Harpactira atra (Latreille, 1832) (type) – South Africa
Harpactira baviana Purcell, 1903 – South Africa
Harpactira cafreriana (Walckenaer, 1837) – South Africa
Harpactira chrysogaster Pocock, 1897 – South Africa
Harpactira curator Pocock, 1898 – South Africa
Harpactira curvipes Pocock, 1897 – South Africa
Harpactira dictator Purcell, 1902 – South Africa
Harpactira gigas Pocock, 1898 – South Africa
Harpactira hamiltoni Pocock, 1902 – South Africa
Harpactira lineata Pocock, 1897 – South Africa
Harpactira lyrata (Simon, 1892) – South Africa
Harpactira marksi Purcell, 1902 – South Africa
Harpactira namaquensis Purcell, 1902 – Namibia, South Africa
Harpactira pulchripes Pocock, 1901 – South Africa
Harpactira tigrina Ausserer, 1875 – South Africa

See also
 List of Theraphosidae species

References

Theraphosidae genera
Spiders of Africa
Taxa named by Anton Ausserer
Theraphosidae